Edappon is a small town situated in Nooranad panchayat in Alappuzha  district of the state of Kerala in South India. It is on the bank of the Achankovil river.

Location
It is situated at a distance of 4 kilometres to the west of Pandalam and 12 km to the east of Mavelikara.

Temples
Many ancient temples are located here.

 Puthenkavil Sree Devi Temple
 Dakshina kailasam (Siva Temple), Attuva
 Gurunatankavu Temple
 PlakkattethuTemple.

Churches
 St. Bursoumas Orthodox Church, Attuva  
 Immanuel Marthoma Church, Ayranikudy
 Church of God Pentecostal Church and
 Evanjalical Church Ayranikudy are the other major churches

Also the people of Edappon playing a vital role in the Maha Sivarathri of Padanilam Parabrahma Temple and Vishu of Sargakavu Devi Temple.

Colleges
 Sree Buddha College of Engineering
 Josco College of Nursing
 Josco College of Paramedical

Schools
 High School, Edappon
 Govt.U.P School, Cherumukha
 Veerasaiva U.P. School, AV Junction
 Vivekananda Vidyapedam School
 St. Bursoumas Public School & Junior College, Ayranikudy

Hospitals
 Josco Multispeciality Hospital
 Govt. Primary Health Centre
 Santhi Hospital (Clinic)

References

External links
 St Bursoumas Orthodox Church

Villages in Alappuzha district